Guangzhou Institutes of Biomedicine and Health (GIBH), affiliated with the Chinese Academy of Sciences, is a government-sponsored scientific research institution with independent legal jurisdiction. GIBH was established by the Chinese Academy of Sciences, Guangdong Provincial Government and Guangzhou Municipal Government. The managerial mechanism of GIBH is the responsibility of Director-General, under the authority of the board of trustees.

On July 5, 2003, an agreement of 3-party joint cooperation was signed by Lu Yongxiang (Director-General of Chinese Academy of Sciences), Huang Huahua (Provincial Governor of Guangdong Province) and Zhang Guangning (Mayor of Guangzhou City). Establishment of GIBH was officially initiated in 2004.

References

External links 
GIBH
Chinese Academy of Sciences

Genetics or genomics research institutions
Research institutes in China